Managra is an original novel written by Stephen Marley and based on the long-running British science fiction television series Doctor Who. The novel features the Fourth Doctor and Sarah.

The title is an anagram of the word "anagram".

Plot
The Doctor and Sarah Jane arrive in Europa, a reconstructed amalgamation of 16th, 17th and 18th century Europe a thousand years in the future. Here, all sorts of historical personalities collide: for example, Lord Byron battles Torquemada's Inquisition while Mary Shelley is writing a sequel to Frankenstein. The newcomers are then accused of murdering the Pope, and to clear their innocence, helped only by a young vampire hunter and Byron, they must face the terrifying Theatre of Transmogrification.

External links

1995 British novels
1995 science fiction novels
Virgin Missing Adventures
Fourth Doctor novels
Vampire novels
Novels by Stephen Marley
Fiction set in the 1610s
Fiction set in the 4th millennium